Buhweju is a kingdom in what is Uganda today. It was incorporated into the British Ankole protectorate in 1901. It was ruled by an Omugabe,  which is often translated as "king of kings".

The last hereditary Omugabe was Daudi Ndibarema 1901-1967 (“ex-Kangaho”). His father, Omugabe Mugimba Ndagara III, was shot dead on 12 July 1901 at his palace at Kishwegwe, Buhweju by a British colonial expedition commander Lt. Lacy.

References
World Statesmen.org

Ankole
Buhweju District
Western Region, Uganda